Leland Holt Vittert (born August 31, 1982) is an American journalist who is the anchor and national correspondent for NewsNation. He worked for Fox News from 2010 to 2021, initially as a foreign correspondent based in Jerusalem and later as a news presenter. He was a substitute host on Fox & Friends, America's Newsroom, and Happening Now.

Early life and education 
Vittert was born on August 31, 1982 in Illinois. Vittert earned a Bachelor of Arts from the Medill School of Journalism at Northwestern University, where he joined Theta Chi. He also completed The General Course, a one-year study abroad program at the London School of Economics.

Career 
During the 2000s, Vittert anchored the weekend news at KDVR-TV in Denver, Colorado and was a reporter for WFTV-TV in Orlando, Florida. He was also at KATV-TV in Little Rock, Arkansas, KNWA-TV in Fayetteville, Arkansas, and WMTV-TV in Madison, Wisconsin.

Vittert's coverage of the Freddie Gray riots in Baltimore was praised by Mediaite and The Daily Caller. According to Mediaite, Vittert "made his mark…by standing among protesters, facing a silent line of riot police, while interviewing residents and demonstrators affected by the story in various ways. He [broke] news about the Baltimore mayor's alleged stand-down orders for police, and [had] tense question-and-answer exchanges with lawmakers and public figures throughout the city."

Arriving in the Middle East in 2010, Vittert began following the Arab Spring. In 2011, he was one of the few reporters live on the ground in Cairo's Tahrir Square on the night that Egyptian President Hosni Mubarak left power. Vittert subsequently traveled to Libya during the first days of the country's revolution, where he reported on Muammar Gadaffi's counterattack and later from the besieged city of Misurata.

Vittert covered Operation Pillar of Cloud, the 2012 war between Israel and Hamas. He has interviewed Muhammad al-Zawahiri, the brother of Al-Qaeda leader Ayman al-Zawahiri.

Before coming to Washington, D.C. in 2014, Vittert spent a month in Eastern Ukraine as Russian-backed militias took over parts of the country.

While covering the George Floyd protests outside the White House in Washington, D.C., Vittert and his crew were attacked by protesters and later chased away from the area. In an interview on Cavuto Live the following day, Vittert stated that he and his crew were assaulted after a protester realized they were employed by Fox News.

Vittert's last on-air appearance on Fox News was in January 2021; he left the network in April 2021. A Fox News spokesperson said, "We have mutually and amicably parted ways with Leland Vittert", leaving it unclear whether he quit or was fired. On May 5, 2021, Nexstar announced that Vittert will join NewsNation starting May 17, 2021, as a national correspondent and anchor. On May 17, 2021, Vittert made his first appearance for NewsNation on The Donlon Report and NewsNation Prime. On July 8, 2021, Nexstar announced that Vittert will anchor a primetime show called On Balance with Leland Vittert on NewsNation starting July 19, 2021.

Personal life 
Described as “dapper and well-spoken,” Vittert won Westword's “Best Hair on a TV Anchor Award” in 2007. His sister, Liberty Vittert, is a television chef and professor of data science at Harvard University.

References

Place of birth missing (living people)
Alumni of the London School of Economics
American television news anchors
Living people
Medill School of Journalism alumni
Northwestern University alumni
American male journalists
21st-century American journalists
1982 births